Hans Schenk (1 January 1936 – 19 January 2006) was a German athlete. He competed in the men's javelin throw at the 1964 Summer Olympics.

References

1936 births
2006 deaths
Athletes (track and field) at the 1964 Summer Olympics
German male javelin throwers
Olympic athletes of the United Team of Germany
Sportspeople from Königsberg